Calmar ratio (or Drawdown ratio) is a performance measurement used to evaluate Commodity Trading Advisors and hedge funds. It was created by Terry W. Young and first published in 1991 in the trade journal Futures.

Young owned California Managed Accounts, a firm in Santa Ynez, California, which managed client funds and published the newsletter CMA Reports. The name of his ratio "Calmar" is an acronym of his company's name and its newsletter: CALifornia Managed Accounts Reports. Young defined it thus:

Young believed the Calmar ratio was superior because

It should be mentioned that a competitor newsletter, Managed Account Reports (founded in 1979 by publisher Leon Rose), had previously defined and popularized another performance measurement, the MAR Ratio, equal to the compound annual return from inception, divided by the maximum drawdown from inception.

Although the Calmar ratio and MAR ratio are sometimes assumed to be identical, they are in fact different: Calmar ratio uses 36 months of performance data, whereas MAR ratio uses all performance data from inception onwards. Later versions of the Calmar ratio introduce the risk free rate into the numerator to create a Sharpe type ratio.

See also
 Omega ratio
 Risk return ratio

References

Financial ratios